The M-28–Sand River Bridge is a bridge located on M-28 over the Sand River in Onota Township, Michigan. It was listed on the National Register of Historic Places in 1999.

History
The M-28–Sand River Bridge was designed by the Michigan State Highway Department in 1939 to carry what was then M-94 over the Sand River. The Alpine Excavating Company of St. Ignace, Michigan, was awarded the construction contract, and soon began work on the substructural excavation. On June 16, 1939, a surge of water from Lake Superior flooded the abutment cofferdams, and extensive repairs had to be made. However, the bridge was completed later that year, and has carried traffic since. A later route change redesignated the roadway as part of M-28.

Description
It has a so-called rigid-frame construction, which was a new development by the highway department at the time the bridge was built. The bridge has concrete and steel guardrails and horizontal Art Moderne scoring on the sidewalls of the abutments. Despite its age, the bridge remains in excellent condition.

See also

References

External links

photos and description from HistoricBridges.org

Road bridges on the National Register of Historic Places in Michigan
Bridges completed in 1939
Buildings and structures in Alger County, Michigan
Transportation in Alger County, Michigan
National Register of Historic Places in Alger County, Michigan
Concrete bridges in the United States
M-28 (Michigan highway)